Syrnola producta is a species of sea snail, a marine gastropod mollusk in the family Pyramidellidae, the pyrams and their allies.

Description
The length of the shell varies between 4 mm and 6.4 mm. The teleoconch of the smooth shell contains eight flatly convex whorls. The color of the shell is white, under a light brown epidermis. The columella is flexuously plicate.

Distribution
This species occurs in the following locations:
 Northwest Atlantic off Massachusetts, Connecticut, New York, and New Jersey

Notes
Additional information regarding this species:
 Distribution: Range: 42°N to 40°N; 74°W to 70°W. Distribution: USA: Massachusetts, Connecticut, New York, New Jersey

References

External links
 To Biodiversity Heritage Library (6 publications)
 To Encyclopedia of Life
 To World Register of Marine Species

Pyramidellidae
Gastropods described in 1840